The 1964 Ethiopian–Somali Border War was a two month long conflict between the Somali Republic and the Ethiopian Empire. Fighting erupted in multiple locations on the border following support by the Somali government to insurgents in the Ogaden region, who sought secession from Ethiopian rule and unification under a Greater Somalia. 

The conflict was the first war between Somalia and Ethiopia in the modern era.

Background 

After the independence and unification of British Somaliland and the Trust Territory of Somaliland on July 1, 1960, one of the major goals of the Somali Republic was the unification of Greater Somalia, which included the Somali region in Ethiopia. Following the establishment of the Republic of Somalia, the Ethiopian government, sensing the looming Somali threat, immediately dispatched troops to setup military bases in the Ogaden region, displacing and killing hundreds of Somalis in August 1960, who made up the ethnic majority of the territory. Though the Ethiopian troops (who represented the only significant Ethiopian presence in the region) were not well received by the population, it would be another 2 years until rebellion would begin in the region.

In 1962, the Somali government would aid the Bale revolt that had begun among the Somali and Oromo populations of Ethiopia.

Minor clashes began in 1963 between Ethiopian police and armed parties of Somali nomads, steadily increasing hostilities. Soon after, numerous Somali district commissioners in Ogaden were removed and replaced with Ethiopian ones, inflaming fears of attempts to "Ethopianize" the Somali of the Ogaden.

Ogaden Insurgency Begins 
On 16 June 1963, the Ethiopian government began its first attempts to collect taxes in the Ogaden region, greatly incensing the already discontent Somali population, as they had lived without taxation for centuries. At Hodayo, a watering place north of Werder, 300 men picked a former public official named Mukhtal Dahir, to lead an insurgency against the Ethiopians in what would later become known as the Western Somali Liberation Front (sometimes referred to as the Ogaden Liberation Front, not to be confused with the later Ogaden National Liberation Front). Some of the guerrillas were equipped by the Somali government, though Dahir would later allege that the only substantial support that they had received from Somalia had been related to treating wounded and taking in refugees.

The New York Times reported a statement on the origins of the insurgency by Mukthal Dahir, who summarized the perspective of the Somali rebels in the Ogaden:“We wanted our freedom. It was impossible to seek it through democratic means in a country where there is no free speech and no political party machinery, where expeditions are sent to collect taxes by force — seizing camels and mil-let crops. When we asked the Emperor for internal self-government, he threatened to shoot 180 Somali chiefs. He had an inkling what we were up to, and tried to impose a new head tax on cattle. Quran schools were ordered closed, and the laws allowed for one wife and no divorce. All this interfered with Muslim Somali traditions; and as leaders, we were expected to execute this policy. We discussed it and decided to pull out. When the Ethiopians discovered our opposition, they intended to arrest all of us. But by that time we had gone into hiding, where we formed the Liberation Government.”For nine months the insurgency fought against the Ethiopian army, swelling from just 300 to an estimated 3,000 to 12,000 insurgents (estimates greatly vary) and eventually going as far as to form a "liberation government" Many neutral Ogaden Somalis had been alienated by the loss of relatives, herds and homes in Ethiopian reprisal raids on their border villages, inflaming the resistance. At one point, nearly 70 percent of the Ogaden was under WSLF/OLF control, and operations would mostly be carried out in the lowland Hararghe and Bale provinces of Ethiopia The insurgencies surprising early success is attributed to the terrain advantage the Ogaden offered, ideal for traditional guerrilla hit‐and‐run tactics, placing the mechanized troops at a large disadvantage.

The Ethiopian government argued that the conflict was a result of armed bandits being sent across the border by Somalia to harass the country into ceding a large slice of Ethiopian territory, to which the Somali government repeatedly denied that the it either inspired or fomented the troubles in Ogaden. Despite the Ethiopian governments allegations, it was widely recognized that the Somali government could assert no real control over the Ogaden insurgents, as the rebels had made it clear that they were not willing to take orders from Mogadishu, despite desiring its recognition.

Suppression of Insurgency and First Border Clashes 
In August 1963 Ethiopian forces regrouped, and the 3rd Division of Imperial Army swept back through the Ogaden with relative ease, aided by the inexperienced WSLF/OLF guerrillas who utilized unsophisticated tactics and an eight-week-long air campaign against Somali targets on both sides of the border. International observers reported at least 500 had been killed in the fighting on both sides.

Ethiopian Emperor Haile Selassie responded to the insurrection with brutal and repressive crackdowns against the Somalis in the Ogaden region. The Ethiopian government began mounting punitive expeditions on Somali nomads, which consisted of the total destruction or confiscation of livestock in the Somali nomadic pastoral communities. The news of these crackdowns exacerbated the already deteriorating relations between Somalia and Ethiopia, and clashes between their forces began to break out during in late 1963 and early 1964. Though the newly formed Somali government and army was weak, it had felt pressured and obliged to respond to what Somali citizens widely perceived as oppression of its brethren by an Ethiopian military occupation.

In November 1963, small units of Somali soldiers allegedly began to join and operate with the Somali Ogaden insurgents. That same month, the Somali government would sign an agreement with the Soviet Union to begin working toward the creation of a 20,000 man army, effectively quadrupling the size of the Somali military, greatly alarming the Ethiopian government.

Likely in retaliation for the Somali governments support for the Western Somali Liberation Front and its new military agreement with the USSR, on January 17, 1964, three Ethiopian aircraft bombed multiple Somali border police posts in the upper Juba River region, prompting a diplomatic protest from Somali Foreign Minister Abdullah Issa to the Ethiopian Ambassador, Ato Ahadu Sabure. He warned that the Somali government would hold Ethiopia responsible for any consequences of "armed aggression and violation of national territory". The next day, the Ethiopian Information Ministry announced that its security forces had killed "26 Somali bandits and captured 26" in a border skirmish, while also seizing a Somali military supply vehicle.

War 
Accounts dispute who launched the first serious incursion, but in early February 1964, either Somali or Ethiopian army units crossed the opposing sides border in northern Ogaden. Regardless of who initiated the conflict, soon both sides had begun making military incursions into each others respective territories.

On February 4, Emperor Haile Selassie presided over and emergency meeting of his Cabinet—followed by a second on the 6th, after reports of large‐scale incursion. It was reported on Addis Ababa radio that 30 Somalis had been killed out of 300 man force that had attempted to cross the border in Jiggiga Province. The Ethiopians claimed that 2,000 Somali troops had invaded with artillery support in order to put pressure on the 10 Ethiopian outposts along the border.

Clashes at Tog Wajale/Togochale 
On Friday, February 7, the first serious fighting began when the two militaries clashed between the city of Hargeisa and the of Jijiga along the Somali-Ethiopian border On the February 8th, fighting flared again around the Somali frontier village of Tog Wajale, in the north of the country, after a lull in combat during the night in which the Ethiopians reinforced their positions. The Somalis reported that Ethiopian aircraft had strafed the village and at a news conference also claimed that Ethiopian troops had entered Somalia and clashed with Somali military, but that fighting had not spread beyond the area around Tog Wajale.

Both the Somali and Ethiopian governments invoked states of emergency following the clashes. The Ethiopian government accused Somalia of “expansionist programs,” and Somali Foreign Ministry charged Ethiopia with “armed aggression against the Somali Republic.” On the 9th of February, United Nations Secretary General, U Thant, sent an urgent appeal to both nations to immediately cease hostilities.

After two days of fighting, the border skirmish at Tog Wajale began to assume serious proportions. The Ethiopians sent an airborne company, an infantry battalion, an artillery battery, and a mechanized platoon with M24 tanks to Tog Wajale/Togochale, while the Somalis dispatched heavy artillery and tanks. The Ethiopian Air Force had complete air supremacy over its nearly nonexistent Somali counterpart, as the Somali Air Force possessed few combat capable aircraft at the time. The Somali Airforce dispatched the three De Havilland Vampire trainer jets it had received from Iraq to carry out combat air patrols, and C-47 transport planes flew in two companies of troops to Tog Wajale. Somali forces claimed that eight enemy tanks had been destroyed in first the two days fighting and that the Ethiopian Air Force had begun repeatedly strafing Somali infantry positions. The two sides became engaged in trench warfare less than 100 yards apart and during the fighting Somali mortars scored a direct strike on a munitions depot, destroying an Ethiopian military camp. In the initial clashes, the Ethiopians claimed to have killed 400 Somali troops and wounded 700, while reports of Ethiopian losses alleged that 350 had been killed, half by the munitions depot explosion.

It was some time during this fighting when General Aman Micheal Andom famously requested Emperor Haile Selassie for just 24 hours to march into Mogadishu, and was rebuffed.

On Tuesday, February 11th the Somali government ordered an immediate cease‐fire with the Ethiopians at Tog Wajale.

Southern Clashes and Organization of African Unity Brokered Ceasefire Attempts 
Despite the ceasefire at Tog Wajale the day before, on the 12 February 1964, fighting continued and began spreading further south along the border, with the majority of combat taking place on the Somali side. The Ethiopian Air Force, began strikes across the southwestern frontier against the towns of Feerfeer and Galkacyo. The Somali Information Ministry claimed that the towns of Buuhoodle, Baledk, Haranka and Hididin had all been strafed by Ethiopian aircraft and further alleged that Feerfeer had been bombed for two hours, followed by two unsuccessful attacks by Ethiopian troops. Ethiopian forces claimed to have wiped out nine Somali army trucks packed with troops that night.

On February 12, 1964, both sides broadcast their perspectives on the reasons for the continuing conflict via radio broadcasts:

Addis Abba Radio Service in Amharic broadcast 1100 GMT:"The Somali Republic is the only government which has entrenched in its constitution clauses providing tor expansion in an age when the destruction of European leaders who embarked on expansion is now remembered as a good salutary lesson...But the little Somali Republic adopted this policy of greater Somalia, which was first introduced by colonialists, three years ago. The only work of Abdirashids government since it formation has been to poison the minds of the people with this policy.

According to Abdirashid's plans and aims the answer is simple: They will take a third of Kenya, the whole of Djibouti, and, according to Mogadishu radio, all the Ethiopian territories east of Awash. It means that greater Somalia will be made up from the whole of these territories. Many people may laugh at this, but the fact that Abdirashid's regime takes it seriously should not be overlooked. The result has been that they have not made any development plans to improve the condition of the people, but rather embarked on building a strong army to perpetuate their term of office. Unemployment has increased and so have hardships.

The people started to murmur and showed signs of uprising; the result was the invasion of Ethiopia, Abdirashid's plan is to declare a state of emergency throughout the republic after invading Ethiopia and to get the opportunity to arrest and imprison his opponents and other peaceful leader of the people and annul the elections which are approaching. He is not worried about the losses which will be inflicted upon the people by the double blow which Ethiopia is dealing to see that her territorial sovereignty is respected. He does not care if Somalis are stopped from crossing into Ethiopia and he does not care if Somali soldiers are wiped out after entering Ethiopia. All selfish leaders do the same.

His Imperial Majesty has informed many government leaders and heads of state the conflict can cease only if Abdirashid abandons his expansionist policy; otherwise Ethiopia must ensure that her national sovereignty and dignity are respected. The consequent damage will not fall on Abdirashid and the leaders only, but all Somalis will regret and find it better. They could find a better alternative."Radio Mogadishu in Somali broadcast 1010 GMT:"The Habesha have broken the agreement for the cessation of fighting on both sides of the frontier. At 0545 today, the Habesha army invaded the Somali police post at Feerfeer. The Somali police and military forces there opened fire in retaliation at the invading Habesha troops. The fighting at Feerfeer is reported to be continuing.

Yesterday the Somali Government acted in compliance with the request of the UN Secretary General and world leaders that the border fighting should cease. However, the Habesha army renewed the fighting at the village of Abdulkadir on the Somali border at Dabegorayaleh and Ina Guha. Before the invasion of Feerfeer by the Habesha army Addis Abba radio said this morning that fighting was continuing at Feerfeer. This proves that Addis Ababa radio knew the areas to be attacked by the Habesha army before the fighting. However, the Somali police and army gallantly defeated the Habesha enemy army in the invaded areas.

To date, the Somali republican force has been winning in all encounters. In all engagements, the Habesha army has been crippled and those who survived have taken to their heels. The Somali Government has informed the UN Secretary General, the OAU, and African heads of state about the fresh fighting brought by the Habesha army to the territory of the Somali Republic. The Somali Government has asked the United Nations and the OAU to send an impartial commission to the scene of the fighting end see for themselves how the Habesha army is annihilating the Somali civilian population, livestock, women and children.

The Somali army is confident that it will defend the motherland from the enemy and that the enemy will never set foot in it, The Somali people; civilians and not soldier or policemen, have been reported to have started fighting at several eras against the Habesha army and that many towns have been captured from the Habesha army. Many Habesha troops have been killed there. The Habesha army is carrying a chip on its shoulder."Follow a three day emergency summit, on February 14th The Organization of African Unity called for an immediate ceasefire to Ethiopian‐Somali border war. The OUA also requested both Ethiopia and Somalia halt “provocative and insulting” propaganda campaigns against each other. Both Ethiopian and Somali delegates immediately pledged that they would abide by the decision. In Ethiopia, this manifested as war rallies held in cities and villages throughout country, encouraged by government propagandists, that displayed banners declaring, “We will march to Mogadishu,” and Somalia as radio broadcast condemning Ethiopia imperialism.

On 15 February 1964, the Somali government accused Ethiopia of attacking frontier posts and shelling villages, despite the cease‐fire which was to begin at noon, and claimed that 117 civilian had been killed in air strikes on 12 different villages. The Ethiopians counter accused the Somalis of raids into Ethiopia backed by artillery just before the noon deadline. On Monday February 17, the ceasefire appeared to hold and Premier Abdirashid Ali Shermarke of Somalia reported at a news conference the Ethiopian frontier had been quiet for the day. Soon after, the truce broke and fighting continued. Another OUA ceasefire was attempted in early March, but would also collapse after two days.

Final Clashes and Truce 
In mid March 1964, Somalia and Ethiopia once again opened negotiations in Khartoum, Sudan, in an effort to resolve their border war at the request of numerous African heads of state.

While negotiations were ongoing in Khartoum, sharp fighting resumed on 26 March 1964 around four northwestern Somali border posts—Daba Goriale, Durukhsi, Inia Guha and Abdulkadir. The Somalis charged the Ethiopians with attacking the outposts with airstrikes and artillery, while the Ethiopians countered that Somali troops had launched an attack, killing several of its troops. The next day, the Somali government further claimed that Ethiopian troops had become engaged in combat with civilians and soldiers in the border village of Habas, and warned that the renewed fighting jeopardized the Khartoum talks. The Ethiopian Defense Ministry reported that the Somali military, supported by tanks and artillery, had been repulsed and eight that Ethiopians and 26 Somalis were killed, with one Somali tank reported destroyed and another captured. The Somali government claimed that numerous Ethiopian armored vehicles and a military camp had been destroyed.

On 30 March 1964, four Ethiopian aircraft bombed Hargeisa, the second largest city in Somalia three times and Radio Mogadishu claimed that equipment captured during fighting included two trucks given to Ethiopia under an American aid program, identifiable by the clasped‐hands symbol of the program. Reporters noted that the atmosphere in Somalia at the time had become apathetic, as the border war had been overshadowed by the elections that were taking place that day. Despite accusations from Ethiopia that Somali Premier Shermarke was using the conflict in order to hold on to power, the 1964 Somali Elections that were due to take place 30 March 1964 were not postponed. Premier Abdirashid Ali Shermarke in national address urged Somalis to, "hold the rifle in one hand and vote with the other" The speech and his conduct during the conflict was popular with the Somali public and his party, the Somali Youth League, would go on to win 69 of 123 seats in the National Assembly.

On 30 March 1964, Somalia and Ethiopia agreed to a final cease-fire and fighting subsided 10 days later, following the agreed withdrawal date of 6 April. The final bouts of fighting during the last week of the conflict was centered on the town of Dolo, where the borders of Ethiopia, Somalia and Kenya meet. On 8 April 1964, Ethiopia announced it had withdrawn all its troops from the border area in dispute with Somalia and a delegation met with Somali officials to start a peacekeeping operation in the region. On 18 April 1964, a joint Ethiopian‐Somali commission completed supervision troops withdrawals from the southern border area and moved to do the same in the north. 

Over the next few months, Somali - Ethiopian relations warmed, and the two sides signed an accord in Khartoum, Sudan, agreeing to withdraw their troops from the border, cease hostile propaganda, and start peace negotiations.  A demilitarized zone between six to ten miles deep on both sides of the border was demarcated.

Foreign Aid

Aid to Ethiopia 
The United States abandoned its usual position of neutrality in the Ethiopia-Somali dispute soon after fighting in the Ogaden erupted into a full-scale border war in February 1964 and sided with Ethiopia. The Johnson administration had at first attempted to be to be impartial but as the fighting continued, carried out emergency military airlifts and deployed US army combat training teams with Ethiopian forces. Notably, after Ethiopian forces had inflicted serious damage on Somali forces, Washington threatened to cut off all military aid to Addis Ababa in order to deter the Ethiopian generals who wanted to, "teach the Somalis a lesson" and march all the way to Mogadishu. The scale of American support to Ethiopia was significant enough that the U.S. embassy in Mogadishu sent a cable cautioning Washington that if the full extent of American involvement in the conflict was discovered, there would be a serious political fallout with Somalia.

The Somali Defense Ministry alleged that British troops and planes fought on Ethiopia's side, and that seven trucks loaded with British soldiers arrived from Kenya at Dolo. Ethiopian authorities denied receiving aid from Britain or elsewhere, and countered that it was Somalia that had received outside military help, only specifying that it was from non-Africans.

Aid to Somalia 
Gamal Abdel Nasser's United Arab Republic had delivered plane loads of ammunition to aid the Somali army.

Aftermath 
The border war led to the Organisation of African Unity passing the Cairo declaration in July 1964, which called on all member states to respect existing colonial borders. Most members of the OAU were alienated by Somali irredentism and feared that if a Greater Somalia project was successful, the example might inspire their own ethnic minorities divided by colonial borders to agitate for secession. Somalia would dissent from the OUA's affirmation of present borders, and continue to agitate for a unification referendum in the Ogaden.

Ethiopia and Kenya concluded a mutual defense pact in 1964 in response to what both countries perceived to be the continuing threat from Somalia.

Following the war, American policy in the Horn of Africa became less impartial and more openly pro Ethiopian.

Ogaden Somalis
It was widely recognized during the Khartoum negotiations that any peace accord with the Somali government would not halt the Ogaden insurgency and numerous international observers professed the belief that no genuine lasting progress could be made unless a degree of recognition was given to the nature of the Ogaden liberation movement, which many regarded by many as a genuine independence movement. These concerns were confirmed following signing of the peace accord between Somalia and Ethiopia, when leader of the Ogaden insurgents Muktal Dalhir declared he would ignore the truce, stating:“My people are under no one's jurisdiction and take orders from no one but me. We have no intention of observing any cease-fire. Our fight with Ethiopia has nothing to do with Somalia. We are indifferent to the government position, though we still expect and hope our movement will be recognized both by Somalia and by the world.”After the war the Ethiopian military once again began taking punitive measures against the Somalis of the Ogaden. In May and July 1964, over 22,000 domestic animals were either killed or confiscated by Ethiopian troops, devastating Somali nomads’ most precious source of income, resulting in what amounted to economic warfare on the nomadic way of life. The Ethiopian government also introduced a new policy of land registration to encourage Amhara farmers to resettle in the valuable pasturelands in and around the Ogaden that were used by Somali nomads’ herds as grazing areas. Under the new laws, nomads had no recognized claim to these territory and were harassed by the military as a result. Wells frequented by Somali nomads were poisoned, and new ones were created for the incoming migration of Amhara farmers.

For nearly a year after the war, most major Somali towns in the Ogaden were under military administration and curfew.

Operation Mäbräq (Operation Lightning) 
Believing that Somalia would strike again in the near future, Ethiopian officials prepared a plan in late 1964 called Operation Mäbräq (Operation Lightning). Concealed in total secrecy, the operation planned out the destruction of Somalia's military capacity and detailed an occupation of the former British Somaliland, to be invoked in the event of a Somali invasion. Two years later, another pair of similar operations, Wall and Bunker, were drafted.

References

Notes

Bibliography 

 

Conflicts in 1964
Wars involving Ethiopia
Wars involving Somalia
1964 in Ethiopia
1964 in Somalia
Territorial disputes of Somalia
Territorial disputes of Ethiopia
Ethiopia–Somalia military relations